Klaus Raffeiner (born 1977) is a male badminton player from Italy.

Career
Raffeiner played the 2007 BWF World Championships in men's singles, and was defeated in the first round by Simon Maunoury, of France, 23-21, 21-16. In his home country he won the Italian National Badminton Championships eleven times in a row.

External links
BWF Player Profile

Italian male badminton players
1977 births
Living people
Date of birth missing (living people)
Place of birth missing (living people)